"Easy Lover" is a song performed by Philip Bailey of Earth, Wind & Fire and Phil Collins of Genesis, and jointly written and composed by Bailey, Collins, and Nathan East. The song appeared on Bailey's solo album, Chinese Wall. Collins has performed the song in his live concerts, and it appears on both his 1990 album, Serious Hits... Live!, and his 1998 compilation album, ...Hits. It is Bailey's only US Top 40 hit as a solo artist.

The song was a No. 1 hit in several countries, including Canada, the Netherlands, Ireland, and the United Kingdom. In the U.S., it spent 23 weeks on the Billboard Hot 100 chart, including 7 weeks in the Top 10, and peaked at No. 2 the weeks of 2 February 1985 and 9 February 1985, behind the chart-topping "I Want to Know What Love Is" by Foreigner. In the UK Singles Chart, it reached No. 1, staying there for four weeks. The single sold over a million copies in the U.S. and was certified gold, as the RIAA requirement for a platinum single disc was not lowered to one million units until 1989. In addition, "Easy Lover" has been certified platinum by the British Phonographic Industry (BPI) and Music Canada.

Background
In 1984, Phil Collins was hired as the producer for Philip Bailey's solo album, Chinese Wall.  According to Collins, Bailey approached him at the end of the sessions for the album and asked him to write a song together. In "Phil Collins: My Life in 15 Songs", a 2016 interview he gave to Rolling Stone magazine, Collins said of the song: "So we just started having a jam one night, and went round and round and turned it into a verse and a chorus. We recorded it that night so we wouldn't forget it. That song doesn't sound like any particular era. It's just fantastic." According to the official sheet music, the song is in the key of F minor and has a tempo of 105 BPM, though the studio recording has a tempo of 130 BPM.

Music video
The song's music video, filmed at Etward Studios, London, England, humorously depicts the making of a music video. It was produced by Paul Flattery and directed by Jim Yukich.

Personnel
 Philip Bailey – lead vocals and backing vocals
 Phil Collins – lead vocals and backing vocals, drums, keyboards
 Daryl Stuermer – electric guitar
 Nathan East – bass guitar
 Lesette Wilson – keyboards

Charts

Weekly charts

Year-end charts

Certifications

References

External links
 

1984 singles
1984 songs
1985 singles
American pop rock songs
Cashbox number-one singles
Dance-rock songs
Dutch Top 40 number-one singles
CBS Records singles
Columbia Records singles
Irish Singles Chart number-one singles
Male vocal duets
Oricon International Singles Chart number-one singles
Phil Collins songs
Philip Bailey songs
RPM Top Singles number-one singles
Song recordings produced by Phil Collins
Songs written by Phil Collins
Songs written by Philip Bailey
UK Singles Chart number-one singles